Jortveit is a village in Grimstad municipality in Agder county, Norway. The village is located in the Homborsund area in Eide in southern Grimstad.

References

Villages in Agder
Grimstad